Rubiconia is a genus of true bugs belonging to the family Pentatomidae.

The species of this genus are found in Europe and Japan.

Species:
 Rubiconia intermedia (Wolff, 1811)

References

Pentatomidae